Andrew Long Horner (1863 – 26 January 1916) was an Irish Unionist politician and Member of Parliament (MP) in the House of Commons of the United Kingdom of Great Britain and Ireland.

He was elected for the South Tyrone constituency initially as a Liberal Unionist at the January 1910 general election and re-elected at the December 1910 general election. He died in office in January 1916, and the by-election for his seat was won by the Irish Unionist candidate William Coote, who stood unopposed.

References

External links

1863 births
1916 deaths
Members of the Parliament of the United Kingdom for County Tyrone constituencies (1801–1922)
UK MPs 1910
UK MPs 1910–1918
Politicians from County Tyrone
Irish Unionist Party MPs